Arthur R. Hutchens was a college football player and referee, once Secretary of the Southern  Officials association, and later the Football Rules Committee. Hutchens played as a substitute quarterback for Purdue University in 1908.

References

Purdue Boilermakers football players
American football quarterbacks
American football officials